Lucas Kikoti (born 15 January 1995) is a Tanzanian football attacking midfielder who plays for Namungo.

References

1995 births
Living people
Tanzanian footballers
Tanzania international footballers
Maji Maji F.C. players
Namungo F.C. players
Association football defenders
Tanzanian Premier League players
Tanzania A' international footballers
2020 African Nations Championship players